A mustang is a free-ranging horse of the American west.

Mustang may also refer to:

Aircraft
 North American P-51 Mustang, an American World War II fighter
 North American F-82 Twin Mustang, an American military fighter
 ScaleWings SW51 Mustang, a 70%-sized P-51 replica
 Titan T-51 Mustang, a 75%-sized P-51 replica
 Cessna Citation Mustang, a modern business jet
 Mustang Aeronautics Midget Mustang, a homebuilt sportsplane
 Mustang Aeronautics Mustang II, a two-seat homebuilt sportsplane

Land transportation
 Ford Mustang, a line of U.S. "pony cars"
 Shelby Mustang, a high performance variant series of the Ford Mustang
 Hulas Mustang, an SUV from Hulas Motors
 KAMAZ Mustang, a line of Russian tactical trucks
 Polaris Mustang, a 1965 snowmobile model from Polaris Industries
 Mustang (motorcycle), a manufacturer of lightweight motorcycles

Ships
Mustang (brogan), a Chesapeake Bay brogan built in 1907
, a patrol vessel in commission from 1917 to 1919
, a wooden schooner in commission from 1944 to 1946
, a US Coast Guard patrol vessel commissioned in 1986

Geography
Mustang District, Nepal
Mustang, Oklahoma, United States, a city
Mustang, Texas, United States, a town
Mustang Peak (disambiguation), various summits in the United States
Mustang Creek (disambiguation), various streams in the United States

Arts and entertainment

Music
Fender Mustang, an electric guitar brand from Fender
Mustang (Curtis Amy album)
Mustang! (Donald Byrd album)
Mustang! (Dragon Ash album)
Mustang (Electric Six album)
"The Mustang", by David Gates from the album The David Gates Songbook
The Mustangs, a British blues rock band
Los Mustang, a Spanish rock band

Films
Mustang! (film), a 1959 western film directed by Tom Gries
Mustang (film), a 2015 Turkish-language French film directed by Deniz Gamze Ergüven
The Mustang, a 2019 film directed by Laure de Clermont-Tonnerre

Other arts and entertainment
Roy Mustang, a character from the anime/manga series Fullmetal Alchemist
"Mustang", a poem by Patti Smith from her 1973 book Witt

Sports teams

Canada
Calgary Mustangs (ice hockey), a junior "A" ice hockey team in Calgary, Alberta
Calgary Mustangs (CPSL), a defunct professional soccer team from 1983
Calgary Mustangs (USL), a defunct professional soccer team from 2001 to 2004
Melfort Mustangs, a junior "A" ice hockey team in Melfort, Saskatchewan
Williams Lake Mustangs, a defunct junior ice hockey team based in Williams Lake, British Columbia
Western Ontario Mustangs, the athletics teams of the University of Western Ontario

United States
Billings Mustangs, a minor league baseball team in Billings, Montana
Cal Poly Mustangs, the athletics teams of California Polytechnic State University
Chicago Mustangs (1967–68), an American professional soccer team based in Chicago, Illinois, in the 1967 and 1968 seasons
Chicago Mustangs (PASL), an American professional indoor soccer team awarded a franchise in 2012
Lone Star Mustangs, a Women's Football Alliance team
Martinsville Mustangs, a baseball team in the Coastal Plain League, a collegiate summer baseball league
Phoenix Mustangs, a former professional minor league ice hockey team
Rochester Mustangs, a defunct senior ice hockey team from Rochester, Minnesota
SMU Mustangs, the athletics teams of Southern Methodist University
Washington Mustangs, a defunct soccer team based in Washington, D.C.

Elsewhere
Melbourne Mustangs, a semi-professional ice hockey team in Docklands, Victoria, Australia
Doncaster Mustangs (American football), based in Doncaster, England

Other uses
Mustang (military officer), slang for an American military officer who rises from the enlisted ranks
Task Force Mustang, the deployment unit name for the Combat Aviation Brigade, 36th Infantry Division, Texas Army National Guard
MUSTANG (camera), a bolometer camera for the Green Bank Telescope
Mustang Software, a business that developed the Wildcat! bulletin board system software
Mustang Ranch, first licensed brothel in Nevada
Mustang, codename of a version of Java (software platform) SE 6
Mustang (advertisement), a 2004 advertising campaign promoting Guinness
Vitis mustangensis, a species of grape commonly known as the mustang grape
Mustang wine, a wine from Texas, United States made with mustang grapes

See also

Mustang Sally (disambiguation)
Mastung (disambiguation), places in Pakistan